The 13th Politburo of the Chinese Communist Party was elected at the 1st Plenary Session of the 13th Central Committee on November 2, 1987, consisting of 17 members and 1 alternate member.  During the 2nd plenary session of this politburo, the 1989 Tiananmen Square protests and massacre occurred, and were ultimately crushed by the orders of the 13th Standing Committee of the Chinese Communist Party.  This was preceded by the 12th Politburo of the Chinese Communist Party.  It was succeeded by the 14th Politburo of the Chinese Communist Party.

Members (17)
Zhao Ziyang, General Secretary of the Party Central Committee and member of the Politburo Standing Committee (dismissed in June, 1989)
Li Peng, member of the Politburo Standing Committee
Qiao Shi, member of the Politburo Standing Committee
Hu Qili, member of the Politburo Standing Committee (dismissed in June, 1989)
Yao Yilin, member of the Politburo Standing Committee
Others in stroke order of surnames:
Wan Li
Tian Jiyun
Jiang Zemin, elected General Secretary of the Party Central Committee and member of the Politburo Standing Committee in June, 1989
Li Tieying
Li Ruihuan, elected member of the Politburo Standing Committee in June, 1989
Li Ximing
Yang Rudai
Yang Shangkun
Wu Xueqian
Song Ping, elected member of the Politburo Standing Committee in June, 1989
Hu Yaobang (died in April, 1989)
Qin Jiwei

Alternate member (1)
Ding Guangen

References

External links 
  Gazette of the 1st Session of the 13th CCP Central Committee

Politburo of the Chinese Communist Party
1987 in China